The following is a list of notable deaths in June 2018.

Entries for each day are listed alphabetically by surname. A typical entry lists information in the following sequence:
 Name, age, country of citizenship at birth, subsequent country of citizenship (if applicable), reason for notability, cause of death (if known), and reference.

June 2018

1
Rudolf Beerbohm, 76, German Olympic equestrian.
Poldy Bird, 76, Argentine writer.
Jean-Claude Boulard, 75, French politician, Mayor of Le Mans (since 2001), Senator (2014–2017), and Deputy (1988–1993, 1997–2002).
Dhiraj Choudhury, 82, Indian painter.
Eddy Clearwater, 83, American blues singer and guitarist, heart failure.
Bob Clotworthy, 87, American Hall of Fame diver, Olympic champion (1956) and bronze medalist (1952).
Jill Ker Conway, 83, Australian-American academic and author, President of Smith College (1975–1985).
Giovanni Di Veroli, 85, Italian footballer.
Walter Eich, 93, Swiss footballer (Young Boys, national team).
Giancarlo Ghirardi, 82, Italian physicist, heart attack.
Egon Hoegen, 89, German voice actor.
Hilmar Hoffmann, 92, German film and culture academic.
Maria Martika, 86, Greek actress.
Andrew Massey, 72, British-born American conductor, cancer.
Sam Moore, 88, American Bible publisher.
Malcolm Morley, 86, English painter.
Rouzan al-Najjar, 21, Palestinian nurse, shot.
John Julius Norwich, 88, British historian, travel writer and television personality.
Alejandro Peñaranda, 24, Colombian footballer, shot.
Carlo Peretti, 88, Italian water polo player, Olympic bronze medallist (1952).
William Edward Phipps, 96, American actor (Cinderella, The War of the Worlds, Five), complications from lung cancer.
Kostas Polychroniou, 81, Greek football player and manager (Olympiacos F.C., national team).
Lutz Pyritz, 60, German horse racing trainer and jockey.
Rockin' Rebel, 52, American professional wrestler (ECW, MEWF, CZW), suicide by gunshot.
Sinan Sakić, 61, Serbian turbo-folk singer.
Sanusi, 85, Indonesian Olympic cyclist (1960).
Michael Andrew Screech, 92, British Renaissance scholar.
René Séjourné, 88, French Roman Catholic prelate, Bishop of Saint-Flour (1990–2006).
Fred Van Dusen, 80, American baseball player (Philadelphia Phillies).

2
Mary Baumgartner, 87, American baseball player (AAGPBL).
Joe Berinson, 86, Australian politician, MHR for Perth (1969–1975), Minister for the Environment and Energy (1975), Attorney-General of Western Australia (1983–1993).
Paul D. Boyer, 99, American biochemist, Nobel Prize laureate (1997).
Monte Hill Davis, 86, American classical pianist.
Sir Desmond de Silva, 78, British lawyer.
André Desvages, 74, French Olympic racing cyclist (1964).
Irenäus Eibl-Eibesfeldt, 89, Austrian ethologist.
Vida Ghahremani, 82, Iranian actress and producer.
Joel Grossman, 81, American political scientist, cancer.
Bruce Kison, 68, American baseball player (Pittsburgh Pirates, California Angels) and coach (Kansas City Royals), cancer.
Álvaro Lapuerta, 90, Spanish politician and prosecutor, member of Francoist Courts (1967–1977) and Deputy (1977–2004), complications from dementia.
Roger A. Madigan, 88, American politician, member of the Pennsylvania House of Representatives (1977–1984) and Senate (1985–2008).
Fernando Mazariegos, 80, Guatemalan chemist and inventor, Order of the Quetzal (2017), cardiac arrest.
Nick Meglin, 82, American magazine editor (Mad), heart attack.
Peter Milner, 98, British-Canadian neuroscientist.
Tony Morphett, 80, Australian screenwriter (Blue Heelers, Water Rats), heart attack.
John Ritchie, 70, Scottish football player and manager (Brechin City).
Irving Sandler, 92, American art critic, cancer.
William Simmons, 79, American anthropologist.
C. C. Torbert Jr., 88, American jurist, Chief Justice of the Alabama Supreme Court (1977–1989).
Bernard E. Trainor, 89, American journalist and Marine Corps general.
Emil Wolf, 95, Czech-born American physicist.

3
Mustapha Akanbi, 85, Nigerian jurist, head of the Independent Corrupt Practices Commission (2000–2005).
Doug Altman, 69, British statistician, bowel cancer.
Alessandra Appiano, 59, Italian writer and journalist, suicide.
Robert Brylewski, 57, Polish singer-songwriter (Armia, Brygada Kryzys, Izrael).
Frank Carlucci, 87, American politician, Secretary of Defense (1987–1989), National Security Advisor (1986–1987), complications from Parkinson's disease.
Pamela Ann Davy, 84, Australian actress (Doctor Who, The Avengers, Amsterdam Affair).
Robert Forhan, 82, Canadian Olympic ice hockey player (1960) and politician, Mayor of Newmarket, Ontario (1971–1978).
Jerry Hopkins, 82, American journalist (Rolling Stone) and biographer (Elvis Presley, Jim Morrison).
Jek Yeun Thong, 87, Singaporean politician.
Johnnie Keyes, 78, American pornographic actor (Behind the Green Door), stroke.
Dadaji Ramaji Khobragade, 79, Indian farmer-scientist.
Kent McCray, 89, American television producer (Little House on the Prairie, Bonanza).
Leonid Nevedomsky, 78, Soviet-Russian actor (The Blue Bird, Monologue, Deadly Force), People's Artist of Russia.
Miguel Obando y Bravo, 92, Nicaraguan Roman Catholic cardinal, Archbishop of Managua (1970–2005), heart attack.
Sir John Thomson, 91, British diplomat, High Commissioner to India (1977–1982), Permanent Representative to the United Nations (1982–1987).
Mario Toros, 95, Italian politician, Deputy (1958–1972) and Senator (1972–1987).
Gilbert Trausch, 86, Luxembourgian historian.
Georg von Tiesenhausen, 104, German rocket scientist (Operation Paperclip, Lunar Roving Vehicle).
Kyra Petrovskaya Wayne, 99, Russian-born American author.

4
Michael J. Belton, 83, American astronomer.
Seán Calleary, 86, Irish politician, TD (1973–1992).
Dwight Clark, 61, American football player (San Francisco 49ers), amyotrophic lateral sclerosis.
Jeffrey Coy, 66, American politician, member of the Pennsylvania House of Representatives (1983–2004).
Aleksey Desyatchikov, 85, Soviet Olympic athlete (1960).
Norman Edge, 84, American jazz double-bassist.
Mary Jane Fonder, 75, American convicted murderer, cardiac arrest.
Georgann Johnson, 91, American actress (Dr. Quinn, Medicine Woman, Murphy's Romance, Shoot the Moon).
Steve Kline, 70, American baseball player (New York Yankees).
Canel Konvur, 78, Turkish Olympic high jumper (1960).
J. B. Munro, 81, New Zealand politician and disability advocate, MP for Invercargill (1972–1975).
C. M. Newton, 88, American Hall of Fame college basketball coach (Alabama Crimson Tide, Vanderbilt Commodores) and administrator (Kentucky Wildcats).
Dragan Nikolić, 61, Bosnian Serb war criminal.
Jalal Mansur Nuriddin, 73, American poet and spoken word musician (The Last Poets), cancer.
Marc Ogeret, 86, French singer.
Harold Poynton, 82, English rugby league footballer (national team, Yorkshire, Wakefield Trinity).
Ahmed Said, 92, Egyptian radio broadcaster (Voice of the Arabs).
Abhimanyu Unnuth, 80, Mauritian writer.
Chris Weller, 78, English footballer (Yeovil Yown).
Gareth Williams, 76, Welsh footballer (Cardiff City, Bolton Wanderers, Bury).

5
Yoshiaki Arata, 94, Japanese physicist.
Ira Berlin, 77, American historian, complications from multiple myeloma.
Jānis Bojārs, 62, Latvian shot putter, European championship silver medalist (1982).
Frank Bresee, 93, American radio actor and historian.
Brian Browne, 81, Canadian jazz pianist, lung and tracheal cancer.
Pierre Carniti, 81, Italian trade unionist and politician, Senator (1992–1994).
Bruce Coulter, 90, Canadian football player and coach (Montreal Alouettes, Bishop's Gaiters).
Kay de Villiers, 90, South African neurosurgeon.
Denman, 18, British racehorse, Cheltenham Gold Cup winner (2008).
Daša Drndić, 71, Croatian radio playwright (Radio Belgrade) and author, cancer.
Feng Ting-kuo, 67, Taiwanese politician, Taipei City Councilor (1985–1988), member of the National Assembly (1992–1996) and Legislative Yuan (1996–2008), cardiac arrest.
A. J. Holloway, 79, American politician, Mayor of Biloxi, Mississippi (1993–2015).
Hema Nalin Karunaratne, 54, Sri Lankan journalist, intra-ventricular haemorrhage.
Karl Fritz Lauer, 80, Romanian-German scientist.
Geoff Mason, 88, Australian football player (Melbourne).
Stacy Phillips, 73, American resophonic guitarist and fiddler.
Pedyr Prior, 65, British Cornish nationalist politician, Chairman of Mebyon Kernow (1985–1986).
Darbara Singh, 57, Indian serial killer.
Kate Spade, 55, American fashion designer (Kate Spade New York), suicide by hanging.
David Spiller, 75, British pop artist.
Chuck Taylor, 76, American baseball player (St. Louis Cardinals, Montreal Expos).
Harry Walker, 103, English rugby union player (Coventry).

6
Tinus Bosselaar, 82, Dutch footballer (Sparta, Feyenoord, national team).
Luigi Campanella, 99, Italian Olympic wrestler (1948).
Mike Hammond, 72, Australian football player (Richmond).
Teddy Johnson, 98, English singer (Pearl Carr & Teddy Johnson).
Ümit Kayıhan, 64, Turkish football player and manager.
George N. Leighton, 105, American judge (U.S. District Court for the Northern District of Illinois), pneumonia.
Mateja Matevski, 89, Macedonian poet.
David McFadden, 77, Canadian poet and travel writer.
Kira Muratova, 83, Ukrainian film director, screenwriter and actress.
Alan O'Neill, 47, Irish actor (Sons of Anarchy, Rebel Heart, Fair City), complications from head trauma.
Larry Owen, 63, American baseball player (Atlanta Braves, Kansas City Royals).
Monique Papon, 83, French politician, Senator (2001–2011) and Deputy (1986–1997) for Loire-Atlantique.
Ralph Santolla, 51, American metal guitarist (Deicide, Obituary, Iced Earth), heart attack.
Red Schoendienst, 95, American Hall of Fame baseball player, manager, and coach (St. Louis Cardinals, New York Giants, Milwaukee Braves).
Åke Wärnström, 92, Swedish Olympic boxer (1952).
H. H. Wieder, 99, Romanian-born American physicist.
Mary Wilson, Baroness Wilson of Rievaulx, 102, British poet, spouse of the prime minister (1964–1970, 1974–1976), stroke.
Ian Wrigley, 95, Australian Olympic sports shooter.
Franz M. Wuketits, 62, Austrian biologist and epistemologist.

7
Philippe de Baleine, 96, French author.
Rasul Bux Palejo, 88, Pakistani politician, scholar and writer, founder of Awami Tahreek.
Al Capps, 79, American record producer, arranger and composer.
David Douglas Duncan, 102, American photojournalist.
Minken Fosheim, 62, Norwegian actress (Karl & Co, Tsatsiki, morsan och polisen) and children's author, pancreatic cancer.
Fu Da-ren, 85, Taiwanese sports broadcaster, assisted suicide.
Geoff Gunney, 84, English rugby league player and coach (Hunslet).
Arie den Hartog, 77, Dutch road bicycle racer.
Amos Jordan, 96, American scholar and military officer.
José Marfil Peralta, 97, Spanish WWII soldier and Holocaust survivor.
Arthur Marshall, 83, Australian politician and tennis player, member of the Western Australian Legislative Assembly (1993–2005).
Francis Smerecki, 68, French football player (Limoges) and manager (Guingamp, national youth team).
Peter Stringfellow, 77, English businessman and nightclub owner, cancer.
Viktor Tolmachev, 83, Russian airplane designer and engineer (Antonov).
Gena Turgel, 95, Polish author, Holocaust survivor and educator.
Cliff van Blerk, 79, Australian soccer player.
Michaele Vollbracht, 70, American fashion designer, esophageal cancer.
Oulton Wade, Baron Wade of Chorlton, 85, British politician, member of the House of Lords (1990–2016).
Sir Neil Waters, 87, New Zealand chemist and university administrator, vice-chancellor of Massey University (1983–1995).
Stefan Weber, 71, Austrian singer.
Yao Baoqian, 93, Chinese People's Liberation Army officer, commander of the 24th Group Army.

8
Ibrahim Abiriga, 62, Ugandan politician and military officer, shot.
Per Ahlmark, 79, Swedish politician and writer, Deputy Prime Minister (1976–1978) and leader of the Liberal People's Party (1975–1978).
Helen Chatfield Black, 94, American conservationist.
Jack Borotsik, 68, Canadian ice hockey player (St. Louis Blues).
Gérard Boulanger, 69, French lawyer and politician, cancer.
Anthony Bourdain, 61, American chef, author and television host (No Reservations, Parts Unknown, The Layover), four-time Emmy winner, suicide by hanging.
Vin Bruce, 86, American Cajun musician.
Maria Bueno, 78, Brazilian tennis player, Wimbledon winner (1959, 1960, 1964), mouth cancer.
Freddy Eugen, 77, Danish racing cyclist.
Eunice Gayson, 90, British actress (Dr. No, From Russia with Love, The Revenge of Frankenstein).
Danny Kirwan, 68, British Hall of Fame guitarist (Fleetwood Mac, Tramp), pneumonia.
Pat Lally, 92, Scottish politician, Lord Provost of Glasgow (1996–1999).
Liu Jianfu, 100, Chinese politician, police chief and vice mayor of Beijing.
Liu Yichang, 99, Hong Kong novelist, editor and publisher, a founder of Hong Kong's modern literature.
Jutta Nardenbach, 49, German footballer.
Thodoros Papadimitriou, 87, Greek sculptor.
Janko Pleterski, 95, Slovenian historian, politician and diplomat.
Gino Santercole, 77, Italian singer and songwriter, heart attack.
Leo Sarkisian, 97, American musicologist and broadcaster.
Henry Sharratt, 82, English rugby league player.
Theodore J. Sophocleus, 79, American politician, member of the Maryland House of Delegates (1993–1995, since 1999).
Thomas Stuttaford, 87, British doctor and politician, MP (1970–1974).
Kandala Subrahmanyam, 97, Indian politician.

9
Joan Bernard Armstrong, 77, American judge.
Martin Birrane, 82, Irish businessman, racing driver and team owner (Lola Cars).
Françoise Bonnot, 78, French film editor (Z, Frida, Hanna K.), Oscar winner (1970).
Richard H. Bube, 90, American physicist, materials scientist and theistic evolutionist.
Deborah Cameron, 59, Australian journalist (The Sydney Morning Herald) and radio presenter (ABC Radio Sydney), cancer.
Kristine Ciesinski, 65, American opera singer, glider crash.
Ogobara Doumbo, 62, Malian scientist.
Robert Fine, 72–73, British sociologist.
Murray Fromson, 88, American journalist (CBS News) and professor (University of Southern California), complications from Alzheimer's disease.
Crawford Gates, 96, American composer and conductor.
Lorraine Gordon, 95, American jazz club owner (Village Vanguard), stroke.
George Grubb, 82, British politician, Lord Provost of Edinburgh (2007–2012).
John Wesley Hanes III, 93, American civil servant.
Reinhard Hardegen, 105, German U-boat commander (Battle of the Atlantic).
Kenyatta Jones, 39, American football player (New England Patriots, Washington Redskins), cardiac arrest.
Clemens Kalischer, 97, American photojournalist.
Sylwester Kubica, 68, Polish Olympic gymnast (1968, 1972).
Lin Yu-lin, 81, Taiwanese real estate developer.
Lauri Linna, 87, Finnish politician, MP (1970–1975).
John McKenzie, 80, Canadian ice hockey player (Boston Bruins, Chicago Blackhawks).
Shantaram Naik, 72, Indian politician, member of the Rajya Sabha (2005–2017), heart attack.
Somaweera Senanayake, 74, Sri Lankan screenwriter, novelist and journalist, heart attack.
Laliteshwar Prasad Shahi, 97, Indian politician.
Bryan Todd, 80, English rugby league player.
Fadil Vokrri, 58, Kosovar football player (Prishtina, Yugoslavian national team), president of Football Federation of Kosovo (since 2008), cardiac arrest.
Zhang Junzhao, 65, Chinese film director and screenwriter (One and Eight, The Shining Arc).

10
Stan Anderson, 85, English football player (Sunderland, Newcastle United, Middlesbrough) and manager.
Sir Frederick Atkinson, 98, British civil servant, head of the Government Economic Service (1977–1979).
Douglas J. Bennet, 79, American diplomat and educator, President of Wesleyan University (1995–2007).
Neal E. Boyd, 42, American singer and reality show winner (America's Got Talent), heart and kidney failure and liver disease.
Dorothy Cotton, 88, American civil rights activist (Southern Christian Leadership Conference).
Nils Terje Dalseide, 66, Norwegian judge and civil servant.
Harold L. Dibble, 66, American archaeologist, pancreatic cancer.
Paddy Feeny, 87, British broadcaster (BBC World Service).
Howard Gardiner, 74, Zimbabwean cricketer.
Pavlos Giannakopoulos, 89, Greek businessman and sport administrator (Panathinaikos A.O.).
James Gips, 72, American technologist.
Ben Hills, 76, British-born Australian investigative journalist, cancer.
Hala bint D'aij Al Khalifa, Bahraini royal.
Ras Kimono, 60, Nigerian reggae musician.
Tom McEwen, 81, American drag racer.
Walter Pitman, 89, Canadian politician.
André Pourny, 89, French politician, Senator (1986–2004).
Liliana Ross, 79, Italian-born Chilean actress (La Colorina, Machos).
Edward Sadlowski, 79, American labor activist.
Axel Schmidt, 79, Brazilian Olympic sailor (1968, 1972), Pan American champion (1959).
Christopher Stasheff, 74, American author (The Warlock in Spite of Himself, Starship Troupers, The Enchanter Reborn), Parkinson's disease.
Erling Storrusten, 94, Norwegian businessman.
Yirmiyahu Yovel, 82, Israeli philosopher.

11
Norma Bessouet, 77, Argentine artist.
Maria Butaciu, 78, Romanian folk singer.
John Coates, 85, Australian army general.
Wayne Dockery, 76, American jazz double bassist.
Irene Doutney, 69, Australian politician, cancer.
Oscar Furlong, 90, Argentine Olympic basketball player (1948, 1952), tennis player and coach, FIBA Basketball World Cup MVP (1950).
Bonaldo Giaiotti, 85, Italian opera singer.
Roilo Golez, 71, Filipino politician, Postmaster General and adviser to the National Security Council, heart attack.
Marcel Hénaff, 75, French philosopher and anthropologist.
Yvette Horner, 95, French accordionist.
Victoria Kalima, 45, Zambian politician, Minister of Gender (since 2016).
Roman Kłosowski, 89, Polish actor (Before Twilight).
Adel Mahmoud, 76, Egyptian-American infectious-disease expert credited with the HPV and rotavirus vaccines, brain hemorrhage.
A. M. Paraman, 91, Indian politician.
Rumen Petkov, 70, Bulgarian animator and director (Aaahh!!! Real Monsters, Johnny Bravo, Dexter's Laboratory), Palme d'Or winner (1985).
John Shepherd, 86, English footballer (Millwall, Brighton & Hove Albion, Gillingham).
Larry Thomas, 70, American political advisor, cancer.

12
Ram Chander Bainda, 72, Indian politician, member of the Lok Sabha (1996–2004).
José Carlos Bernardo, 73, Brazilian footballer.
Yakov Brand, 63, Russian cardiac surgeon and TV presenter.
Robert Alan Browne, 86, American actor (Santa Barbara, Psycho).
Patricia Adkins Chiti, British-born Italian musician and musicologist.
Jack Cuffe, 87, Australian footballer.
Helena Dunicz-Niwińska, 102, Polish violinist, translator and author.
Keith Fahnhorst, 66, American football player (San Francisco 49ers).
Jon Hiseman, 73, English drummer (Colosseum, Colosseum II, John Mayall & the Bluesbreakers), brain cancer.
Antônio Carlos Konder Reis, 94, Brazilian politician, Senator (1963–1975), Deputy (1955–1963, 1987–1991, 1998–2003), governor of Santa Catarina (1975–1979, 1994–1995).
Jarosław Kozidrak, 63, Polish guitarist, keyboardist and composer.
Jack Laxer, 91, American photographer.
Bhaiyyu Maharaj, 50, Indian spiritual guru, suicide by gunshot.
Al Meltzer, 89, American sportscaster.
Stephen Reid, 68, Canadian author and bank robber (The Stopwatch Gang), heart failure and complications of pneumonia.
Pandel Savic, 92, Macedonian-born American football player (Ohio State Buckeyes), complications from Alzheimer's disease.
Freddy Sofian, 69, Indonesian artist.
Renato Vrbičić, 47, Croatian water polo player, Olympic silver medalist (1996), heart attack.

13
Myrtle Allen, 94, Irish chef, restaurateur (Ballymaloe House) and hotelier, Michelin star winner, pneumonia.
Benedetto Cottone, 100, Italian politician, Deputy (1953–1958, 1963–1976).
Arkangel de la Muerte, 52, Mexican professional wrestler (CMLL), heart attack.
Eurydice Dixon, 22, Australian comedian, strangulation.
Anne Donovan, 56, American Hall of Fame basketball player and coach, Olympic champion (1984, 1988, 2008), heart failure.
John Farley, 85, British pilot.
D. J. Fontana, 87, American Hall of Fame rock drummer (Elvis Presley).
Tom Gear, 69, American politician, member of the Virginia House of Delegates (2002–2010).
J. Alex Haller, 91, American pediatric surgeon (Johns Hopkins School of Medicine).
Rory Kiely, 84, Irish politician, Cathaoirleach of Seanad Éireann (2002–2007).
Ronald I. Meshbesher, 85, American lawyer, complications from Alzheimer's disease.
Milan Mrkusich, 93, New Zealand artist and designer.
Charles Vinci, 85, American weightlifter, Olympic champion (1956, 1960).

14
Robin Boyd, 94, Irish theologian and missionary.
Shujaat Bukhari, 50, Indian journalist, shot.
Gene Ceppetelli, 78, Canadian-born American football player (Philadelphia Eagles, Hamilton Tiger-Cats, Montreal Alouettes).
Fazlullah, 43, Pakistani Sharia advocate and insurgent, leader of TNSM (since 2002) and TTP (since 2013), drone strike.
Yvonne Gilan, 86, British actress (Fawlty Towers, Chariots of Fire, Empire of the Sun), breast and lung cancer.
Stanislav Govorukhin, 82, Russian film director, screenwriter and politician.
Vincent R. Gray, 96, British-born New Zealand chemist and climate change denier.
Mongi Kooli, 88, Tunisian politician.
Steve Kuzmicich, 86, New Zealand statistician.
Archibald Montgomerie, 18th Earl of Eglinton, 78, British aristocrat.
Ed Roebuck, 86, American baseball player (Brooklyn/Los Angeles Dodgers, Philadelphia Phillies).
Ettore Romoli, 80, Italian politician, Senator (1994–1996) and Deputy (2001–2006).
Sonia Scurfield, 89, Canadian sports team owner (Calgary Flames), cancer.
Gunnar Vada, 91, Norwegian politician, MP (1977–1986).
Marta Weigle, 73, American folklorist and anthropologist.

15
Gerald Barnbaum, 84, American pharmacist and fraudster.
Nina Baym, 82, American literary critic and historian, complications from dementia.
Delia Bell, 83, American bluegrass singer.
Manuel José Bonnet, 81, Colombian soldier, academic (Del Rosario University) and politician, Commandant of the Army (1996–1997), Governor of Magdalena (2010–2012), cancer.
Milton Clark, 95, Australian footballer (Essendon, North Melbourne).
Joe DeNardo, 87, American meteorologist (WTAE).
Leslie Grantham, 71, English actor (EastEnders, Fort Boyard, The Paradise Club) and convicted murderer.
Enoch zu Guttenberg, 71, German conductor.
Frank Harden, 95, American radio announcer.
Arne Martin Klausen, 90, Norwegian social anthropologist.
Nick Knox, 60, American drummer (The Cramps, Electric Eels).
*Joseph Li Mingshu, 93, Chinese clandestine Roman Catholic prelate, Bishop of Qingdao (since 2000).
Buddy MacEachern, 77, Canadian politician, Alzheimer's disease.
Rita Marko, 98, Albanian politician.
Richard Millard, 103, American Episcopal prelate, Bishop of California (1960-1978).
Matt Murphy, 88, American blues guitarist (The Blues Brothers & Howlin' Wolf).
Raoul Van Caenegem, 90, Belgian historian.
Darío Villalba, 79, Spanish painter, photographer and Olympic figure skater (1956).
Macdara Woods, 76, Irish poet.

16
María José Alcón, 57, Spanish jurist and politician, Valencia city councilor (1995–2009), balcony fall.
Alvarito, 82, Spanish football player (Real Oviedo, Atlético Madrid), and manager (Shelbourne).
Martin Bregman, 92, American film producer (Scarface, Dog Day Afternoon, Carlito's Way), cerebral hemorrhage.
Cecile Cilliers, 85, South African writer.
Antonio Giuliano, 88, Italian classical archaeologist and historian.
Russell MacNeil, 87, Canadian politician.
Nicholas Mastromatteo, 84, American luger.
Syd Nomis, 76, South African rugby union player (Transvaal, national team), heart attack.
M. Azizur Rahman, 77, Canadian electrical engineer.
Gennady Rozhdestvensky, 87, Russian conductor.
Remo Segnana, 92, Italian politician, Senator (1968–1983).
Victor Shabangu, 48, Swazi Olympic athlete.
Ronnie Sheed, 71, Scottish footballer (Kilmarnock, Partick Thistle).
George Stamatoyannopoulos, 84, Greek-born American medical researcher and geneticist.
Euan Howard, 4th Baron Strathcona and Mount Royal, 94, British politician, member of House of Lords (1959–1999).
Ken Wood, 88, Australian swimming coach.

17
John Blayney, 93, Irish judge and rugby union player.
Elizabeth Brackett, 76, American television journalist (Chicago Tonight, PBS NewsHour), neck injury from bicycle fall.
William Chong Wong, 67, Honduran economist and politician, Minister of Finance (2004–2006, 2010–2012), co-founder of Central American Technological University, respiratory failure.
Hellmut Fritzsche, 91, German-born American physicist, assisted suicide.
Troy Hurtubise, 54, Canadian inventor and conservationist, subject of Project Grizzly, traffic collision.
Derek Ingram, 93, English journalist.
Igor Muradyan, 61, Armenian political activist.
O. Timothy O'Meara, 90, American mathematician.
Rebecca Parris, 66, American jazz singer.
Aihud Pevsner, 92, American physicist.
Dutch Rennert, 88, American baseball umpire.
Stephen E. Robinson, 70, American religious scholar.
David Selberg, 23, Swedish ice hockey player (Luleå, Piteå), suicide.
Andrei Ivanovich Stepanov, 88, Soviet-born Russian diplomat and author.
Zhao Nanqi, 91, Korean-born Chinese general and politician, Director of the People's Liberation Army General Logistics Department.
Franco Zurlo, 77, Italian Olympic boxer, European bantamweight champion (1969–1971, 1977–1978).

18
Ahmad Ahmadi, 84, Iranian Islamic philosopher, heart attack.
Walter Bahr, 91, American Hall of Fame soccer player (Philadelphia Nationals, national team), complications from a broken hip.
Billy Connors, 76, American baseball player (Chicago Cubs, New York Mets) and coach (New York Yankees).
Graham Davy, 81, New Zealand athlete and sports administrator.
Ivor Dennis, 86, Sri Lankan singer.
Upendra Devkota, 64, Nepalese neurosurgeon, gallbladder cancer.
Paul Gratzik, 82, German writer.
Ron Healey, 65, Irish footballer (Manchester City, Cardiff City, national team).
Go Kato, 80, Japanese actor, gallbladder cancer.
Theerasak Longji, 26, Thai murderer, execution by lethal injection.
Barry McDaniel, 87, American opera singer.
Gordon Norton, 93, Canadian yacht racer.
Kostas Politis, 76, Greek basketball coach (national team), EuroBasket champion (1987).
Claude Ramsey, 75, American politician, member of the Tennessee House of Representatives (1972–1978).
Felix Rappaport, 65, American casino operator (Foxwoods Casino), heart disease.
Maria Rohm, 72, Austrian actress (99 Women, Venus in Furs).
Billy Sammeth, 66, American talent manager (Dolly Parton, Cher, Joan Rivers), pancreatic cancer.
Bertha Sanseverino, 72, Uruguayan politician, member of the Departmental Board of Montevideo (1995–2004) and the Chamber of Representatives (since 2010).
Nathan Shaham, 93, Israeli writer.
Lawrence A. Skantze, 89, American military officer.
Marta Terry González, 87, Cuban librarian.
Big Van Vader, 63, American professional wrestler (NJPW, WWF) and football player (Los Angeles Rams), heart failure and pneumonia.
Richard Valeriani, 85, American NBC News correspondent.
Magalì Vettorazzo, 76, Italian Olympic pentathlete (1968).
Jimmy Wopo, 21, American rapper, shot.
XXXTentacion, 20, American rapper ("Look at Me", "Jocelyn Flores", "Sad!"), shot.

19
Stanley Cavell, 91, American philosopher, heart failure.
Ivan Drach, 81, Ukrainian poet, screenwriter and politician, member of Verkhovna Rada (1990–1994, 1998–2000, 2002–2006).
Efrén Echeverría, 86, Paraguayan musician, composer, and record collector.
Princess Elisabeth of Denmark, 83, Danish princess.
Katriina Elovirta, 57, Finnish football player and referee (FIFA, UEFA), Finnish Women's Cup champion (1990).
C. H. Gimingham, 95, British botanist.
Sergio Gonella, 85, Italian Hall of Fame football referee (1978 FIFA World Cup Final).
Hubert Green, 71, American Hall of Fame golfer, U.S. Open (1977) and PGA (1985) champion, throat cancer.
Stefan Kanfer, 85, American journalist (Time).
Bill Kenville, 87, American basketball player (Syracuse Nationals, Detroit Pistons).
Chuck Klingbeil, 52, American football player (Miami Dolphins).
Koko, 46, American-bred western lowland gorilla.
Paul John Marx, 83, French Roman Catholic prelate, Bishop of Kerema (Papua New Guinea) (1988–2010).
Don Mason, 73, American baseball player (San Francisco Giants, San Diego Padres).
Leonard McComb, 87, British painter.
Ángel Medardo Luzuriaga, 82, Ecuadorian Andean cumbia musician.
Ian Orme, 65, British-American microbiologist.
Bansi Quinteros, 41, Spanish keyboardist (GMS), blood cancer.
Gillian Raine, 91, British actress (Last of the Long-haired Boys, The Hour).
Nicholas Rudall, 78, British academic and theatre director, colon and liver cancer.
Jane Cronin Scanlon, 95, American mathematician.
Lowrell Simon, 75, American soul singer-songwriter (The Lost Generation).
Jack Stallings, 87, American baseball coach (Georgia Southern Eagles).
Nerella Venu Madhav, 85, Indian impressionist.
Frank Vickery, 67, Welsh playwright.
Peter Wilmot-Sitwell, 83, British stockbroker.

20
Ken Albiston, 91, Australian footballer (Richmond, Melbourne).
David Bianco, 63–64, American record producer, engineer and mixer (Tom Petty, Teenage Fanclub, Bob Dylan), stroke.
Errikos Briolas, 84, Greek actor.
Dante Caputo, 74, Argentine diplomat and politician, President of the United Nations General Assembly (1988–1989), Minister of Foreign Relations (1983–1989).
Dick Danehe, 97, American football player (Los Angeles Dons).
Brian Donovan, 77, American journalist (Newsday), Pulitzer Prize winner (1970, 1995), complications from Alzheimer's disease.
Robert Gilpin, 87, American political scientist.
Norman Godman, 81, Scottish politician, MP (1983–2001).
Sophie Gradon, 32, British reality television participant (Love Island) and beauty pageant winner (Miss Great Britain, 2009).
Francisco Griéguez, 99, Spanish WWII soldier and Holocaust survivor.
Lesandro Guzman-Feliz, 15, American homicide victim, stabbed.
Bill Hendon, 73, American politician, member of the U.S. House of Representatives for North Carolina's 11th district (1981–1983, 1985–1987).
Hu Wei, 97, Chinese general, Deputy Chief of Staff of the People's Liberation Army (1974–1984).
Ernie Hunt, 75, English football player (Swindon Town, Wolverhampton Wanderers, Coventry City), complications from Alzheimer's disease.
Sándor Kányádi, 89, Hungarian poet and translator.
Don C. Laubman, 96, Canadian fighter pilot and flying ace.
Wolfgang Lippert, 80, German botanist.
Carroll Morgan, 70, Canadian Olympic boxer (1972), heart attack.
Willie Lee Rose, 91, American historian.
Bill Speakman, 90, British soldier, recipient of the Victoria Cross.
Peter Thomson, 88, Australian Hall of Fame golfer, five-time British Open winner (1954, 1955, 1956, 1958, 1965), Parkinson's disease.
Solveig Laila Thoresen, 87, Norwegian politician.
John Ward, 88, American sportscaster (Vol Network).
Mushtaq Ahmad Yusufi, 94, Pakistani banker, writer and humorist.

21
William Acker, 90, American judge.
Grigory Barenblatt, 90, Russian mathematician.
Carlo Bernardini, 88, Italian politician, Senator (1976–1979).
Hassan El Glaoui, 93, Moroccan painter.
Édouard-Jean Empain, 80, French-Belgian industrialist (Schneider-Empain) and kidnapping victim.
H. Tristram Engelhardt Jr., 77, American philosopher.
Johnny Hubbard, 87, South African footballer (Rangers, Bury, Ayr United).
Oldřich Král, 87, Czech sinologist and translator.
Charles Krauthammer, 68, American political commentator (Fox News) and writer (The Washington Post), Pulitzer Prize winner (1987), small intestine cancer.
Felicia Langer, 87, Israeli-German human rights activist.
George Lindemann, 81, American businessman.
John Mack, 81, American civic leader.
Jamsheed Marker, 95, Pakistani diplomat, Ambassador to the United States (1986–1989).
Elsa Massa, 93, Argentine human rights activist.
Armando Merodio, 82, Spanish footballer (Athletic Bilbao).
Horaţiu Nicolau, 84, Romanian Olympic volleyball player.
Eric Stanley, 94, British literary scholar and historian.
Sir Laurence Street, 91, Australian judge, Chief Justice of New South Wales (1974–1988).
Hugh Stuckey, 89, Australian comedy and drama writer.
Bill Thompson, 80, American politician, member of the Wyoming House of Representatives (2001–2011).
Yan Jizhou, 100, Chinese film director, winner of the Golden Rooster Award for Lifetime Achievement.

22
Halina Aszkiełowicz-Wojno, 71, Polish volleyball player (national team), Olympic bronze medalist (1968).
Tony Bartirome, 86, American baseball player (Pittsburgh Pirates).
Geoff Case, 82, Australian football player (Melbourne).
Steve Condous, 82, Australian politician, Lord Mayor of Adelaide (1987–1993), member of the South Australian House of Assembly (1993–2002).
James S. Denton, 66, American publisher and editor (World Affairs), prostate cancer.
Fred Kornet, 98, American Army lieutenant general.
Nahum Korzhavin, 92, Russian-American poet.
Olga Krzyżanowska, 88, Polish politician, Senator (2001–2005), Deputy Marshal of the Sejm (1993–1997).
Melanie Le Brocquy, 98, Irish sculptor.
Dick Leitsch, 83, American LGBT rights activist, liver cancer.
Dan Lindsley, 92, American geneticist.
Helli Louise, 68, Danish-English actress.
Deanna Lund, 81, American actress (Land of the Giants), pancreatic cancer.
Jahi McMath, 17, American persistent vegetative state patient, liver failure.
Nandagopal, 84, Indian film journalist, editor and critic.
Rezső Nyers, 95, Hungarian politician, Minister of Finance (1960–1962), Hungarian Socialist Workers' Party president (1989).
Geoffrey Oryema, 65, Ugandan musician.
Vinnie Paul, 54, American drummer (Pantera, Damageplan, Hellyeah), heart attack.
Sally Pierone, 97, American artist and family counselor.
Waldir Pires, 91, Brazilian politician, Minister of Defence (2006–2007), Governor of Bahia (1987–1989).
Bagun Sumbrai, 94, Indian politician.

23
Roland Baar, 53, German rower, Olympic silver (1996) and bronze medallist (1992), five-time world champion (1989, 1990, 1991, 1993, 1995), traffic collision.
Fred Chalenor, 62, American bassist.
Jacques Corriveau, 85, Canadian graphic design executive, convicted in Adscam scandal.
Alberto Fouillioux, 77, Chilean footballer (national team).
Donald Hall, 89, American poet, U.S. Poet Laureate (2006).
Ann Hopkins, 74, American business executive, plaintiff in Price Waterhouse v Hopkins.
Yavar Jamalov, 68, Azerbaijani politician, Minister of Defence Industry (since 2006).
Kim Jong-pil, 92, South Korean politician, Prime Minister (1971–1975, 1998–2000).
Gisèle Lamoureux, 75, Canadian botanist and photographer.
Richard Lowitt, 96, American historian.
Dumitru Moțpan, 78, Moldovan politician, President of Parliament (1997–1998).
Phan Huy Lê, 84, Vietnamese historian, heart disease.
Douglas Rae, 87, Scottish businessman.
Violeta Rivas, 80, Argentine singer and actress.
Gazmend Sinani, 27, Kosovan basketball player (Leeds Force), traffic collision.
Ronald Spadafora, 63, American firefighter (FDNY Chief of Fire Prevention), supervised rescue and recovery following 9/11, acute myeloid leukemia.
Cyrus Tang, 88, Chinese-born American investor and philanthropist.
Koro Wētere, 83, New Zealand politician, MP for Western Maori (1969–1996), Minister of Māori Affairs (1984–1990).

24
Xiomara Alfaro, 88, Cuban opera singer.
César Alvarenga, Paraguayan politician, Governor of San Pedro Department (1998–1999), heart attack.
Stanley Anderson, 78, American actor (The Drew Carey Show, Spider-Man, Red Dragon), brain cancer.
Keith Bosley, 80, British poet and translator.
G.S. Sachdev, 83, Indian bansuri player.
Salomón Cohen Levy, 91, Israeli-born Venezuelan civil engineer and mall developer (Centro Sambil).
Francesco Forleo, 76, Italian politician, Deputy (1987–1994), dementia.
Frank Heart, 89, American Hall of Fame computer engineer, co-developer of the IMP, melanoma.
Dan Ingram, 83, American disc jockey (KBOX, WABC, WCBS-FM, WIL), complications of dementia.
Michael Lockwood, 74, British philosopher, Alzheimer's disease.
Darryl N. Johnson, 80, American diplomat.
Sergei Ogorodnikov, 32, Russian ice hockey player (Avtomobilist Yekaterinburg), water bike accident.
Josip Pirmajer, 74, Slovenian football player and manager.
Jacques Saadé, 81, Lebanese-born French shipping executive, founder of CMA CGM.
David J. Simms, 85, Irish mathematician.
Chatri Sophonpanich, 85, Thai banker (Bangkok Bank).
Jens Kristian Thune, 82, Norwegian lawyer and executive.
Pavel Vranský, 97, Czech brigadier general and RAF radio operator, veteran of the siege of Tobruk, War Cross and Medal of Merit recipient.
Harald von Boehmer, 75, German immunologist.
Jim Washington, 66, Canadian football player (Winnipeg Blue Bombers).

25
Constance Adams, 53, American space architect and spaceport planner, cancer.
George Cakobau Jr., Fijian chief and politician.
Jesús Cardenal, 88, Spanish professor (University of the Basque Country) and lawyer, Attorney General (1997–2004).
Angelo Compagnoni, 96, Italian politician, Senator (1963-1972).
Tom Dickinson, 87, Australian cricketer.
Štefka Drolc, 94, Slovenian actress.
Paul Gérin-Lajoie, 98, Canadian lawyer and politician, MNA (1960–1969).
David Goldblatt, 87, South African photographer.
Richard Benjamin Harrison, 77, American pawnbroker and reality television personality (Pawn Stars), Parkinson's disease.
Hiralal Jairam, 84, South African cricketer.
Yosh Kawano, 97, American baseball clubhouse manager (Chicago Cubs), Parkinson's disease.
James M. Keck, 96, American air force lieutenant general.
Jessica Naiga, 53, Ugandan lawyer and judge.
Bo Nilsson, 81, Swedish composer.
John Frederick Pickering, 78, British economist and business consultant.

26
Big Bill Bissonnette, 81, American jazz musician.
Dennis Creffield, 87, British painter.
Harold Davis, 85, Scottish football player (Rangers) and manager.
Andrey Dementyev, 89, Russian poet.
Henri Dirickx, 90, Belgian footballer (national team).
Fedor Frešo, 71, Slovak rock and jazz bassist (The Soulmen, Prúdy), heart failure.
José Luis Meilán Gil, 84, Spanish politician and academic.
Bernard Ginsborg, 93, British pharmacologist and physiologist.
Klaas Hendrikse, 69, Dutch pastor.
Ignatios Lappas, 72, Greek Orthodox metropolitan bishop, Metropolis of Larissa and Tyrnavos (since 1994), heart failure.
Henri Namphy, 85, Haitian military officer and politician, President (1986–1988), lung cancer.
Sabina Ott, 62, American artist, cancer.
Daniel Pilon, 77, Canadian actor (Dallas, Ryan's Hope, Shoot 'Em Up).
Phil Rodgers, 80, American golfer, leukemia.
Joseph Seroussi, 85, Sudanese-born Romanian fashion designer.
Albert Sewell, 90, English football statistician.
Ed Simons, 101, American conductor.
Innocent Umezulike, 64, Nigerian jurist, chief judge of Enugu State.
Jennifer Welles, 81, American pornographic actress (Inside Jennifer Welles).

27
Jack Carroll, 94, Australian rugby union player (national team).
Steve Ditko, 90, American comic book writer and artist (Spider-Man, Doctor Strange, Blue Beetle), heart attack.
Raffaele Farigu, 84, Italian politician, Deputy (1987–1994).
Johnny Guenther, 82, American ten-pin bowler.
Joe Jackson, 89, American band manager (The Jackson 5), patriarch of the Jackson family, pancreatic cancer.
Liz Jackson, 67, Australian journalist, Parkinson's disease.
Pearce Lane, 87, US boxer 
William McBride, 91, Australian doctor.
Ann Nardulli, 69, American endocrinologist, cancer.
Egil Olsen, 70, footballer 
Paola Paternoster, 82, Italian Olympic discus (1956, 1960) and javelin (1956) thrower.
Corran Purdon, 97, British army major general.
Steve Soto, 54, American punk musician (Adolescents, Agent Orange, Legal Weapon).
Steven Hilliard Stern, 80, Canadian-born American director (The Devil and Max Devlin, Mazes and Monsters).
Vladimir Andreyevich Uspensky, 87, Russian mathematician, linguist, writer and doctor.
Alan White, 84, Australian football player (Carlton).

28
Denis Akiyama, 66, Canadian actor (Pixels, X-Men, Johnny Mnemonic), cancer.
Martin Baddeley, 81, English Anglican priest, Archdeacon of Reigate (1996–2000).
Sam Bass, 73, Australian politician.
François Bluche, 92, French historian.
Goran Bunjevčević, 45, Serbian footballer, stroke.
Colin Butts, 58, British novelist, screenwriter and impresario, pancreatic cancer.
Miguel Fenelon Câmara Filho, 93, Brazilian Roman Catholic prelate, Archbishop of Maceió (1976–1984) and Teresina (1984–2001).
Carlos Campos, Venezuelan politician, Governor of Anzoátegui.
Harlan Ellison, 84, American writer (A Boy and His Dog, I Have No Mouth, and I Must Scream, "Repent, Harlequin!" Said the Ticktockman) and screenwriter.
Jeffrey Elman, 70, American psycholinguist.
Rob Hiaasen, 59, American journalist, shot.
Hyon Ju-song, 56, North Korean military officer, execution by firing squad. (death reported on this date)
Abdul Kadir, 65–66, Guyanese politician and convicted conspirator (2007 John F. Kennedy International Airport attack plot), Mayor of Linden (1994–1996).
Mike Kilkenny, 73, Canadian baseball player (Detroit Tigers).
Domenico Losurdo, 76, Italian Marxist philosopher and historian (Liberalism: A Counter-History).
Russ McCubbin, 83, American actor and stuntman (High Plains Drifter, Sudden Impact, Matt Houston).
Christine Nöstlinger, 81, Austrian writer.
Elisha Obed, 66, Bahamian boxer, WBC light-middleweight champion (1975–1976).
Şarık Tara, 88, Turkish executive (Enka).
Keith Warburton, 89, Australian footballer (Carlton).

29
Ai Weiren, 86, Chinese soldier, lieutenant general of the People's Liberation Army.
Kwesi Amissah-Arthur, 67, Ghanaian economist and politician, Governor of the Bank of Ghana (2009–2012) and Vice-President (2012–2017).
Franz Beyer, 96, German violist and musicologist.
Matt Cappotelli, 38, American professional wrestler (OVW) and reality show winner (WWE Tough Enough), brain cancer.
Arvid Carlsson, 95, Swedish neuropharmacologist, Nobel Prize laureate (2000).
Giuseppe Rocco Favale, 82, Italian Roman Catholic prelate, Bishop of Vallo della Lucania (1989–2011).
Chantal Garrigues, 73, French actress (Soda).
Helen Griffin, 59, British actress (Twin Town, Doctor Who) and political activist.
Bill Hamel, 45, American composer and record producer.
Jónas Kristjánsson, 78, Icelandic writer and newspaper editor.
Jacques Madubost, 74, French high jumper, European champion (1966).
María Luisa Mendoza, 88, Mexican journalist, novelist and politician.
Liliane Montevecchi, 85, French-Italian dancer and actress (Nine, Grand Hotel, How to Lose a Guy in 10 Days), Tony winner (1982).
Derrick O'Connor, 77, Irish actor (Lethal Weapon 2, Daredevil, Brazil), pneumonia.
Eugene Pitt, 80, American singer (The Jive Five).
Lawrence Rondon, 68, Trinidadian footballer.
Sir David Smith, 88, British botanist, Principal of the University of Edinburgh (1987–1994).
Irena Szewińska, 72, Soviet-born Polish Hall of Fame sprinter, Olympic champion (1964, 1968, 1976), cancer.
Omar Vergara, 75, Argentine Olympic fencer (1968, 1972, 1976).

30
Nino Assirelli, 92, Italian racing cyclist.
Dagmar Burešová, 88, Czech lawyer and politician, Minister of Justice of Czechoslovakia, Order of Tomáš Garrigue Masaryk recipient.
John E. Casida, 88, American entomologist and toxicologist.
Juraj Halenár, 35, Slovak footballer (Slovan Bratislava), suicide.
Mike Heideman, 70, American basketball coach (Green Bay Phoenix), cancer.
Mark Irwin, 83, New Zealand rugby union player (Otago, national team).
Johan J. Jakobsen, 81, Norwegian politician, Chairman of the Centre Party (1979–1991), Minister of Transport (1983–1986) and Local Government (1989–1990).
Billy Kinard, 84, American football player (Green Bay Packers, Buffalo Bills) and coach (Ole Miss Rebels).
Timothy Murphy, 67, American poet.
Antonella Rebuzzi, 63, Italian politician, Senator (2006–2008), heart attack.
Fuat Sezgin, 93, Turkish Islamic science historian (Goethe University Frankfurt).
Roy de Silva, 80, Sri Lankan director (Re Daniel Dawal Migel), heart attack.
José Antonio Zaldúa, 76, Spanish footballer (F.C. Barcelona, national team, Real Valladolid).

References

2018-06
 06